Stanky is a surname. Notable people with the surname include:

Eddie Stanky (1915–1999), American baseball player
Walt Stanky (1911–1978), American basketball player

See also
John Stankey (born 1962), American businessman